Bremen-Walle is a railway station in Bremen, Germany on the Bremen–Bremerhaven line. It is situated in the Walle district northwest of the city centre and the central station.

The station only offers local services; it is a regular stop for the Verden to Bremen-Vegesack trains, with additional peak time services to and from Bremerhaven.

References

Railway stations in Bremen (state)
Transport in Bremen (city)
Bremen S-Bahn